Michael Brent Mecham (born April 18, 1994) is an American soccer player who most recently played for South Georgia Tormenta in USL League One.

Career

College
Mecham spent his entire college career at the University of North Carolina at Wilmington.  He made a total of 71 appearances for the Seahawks.

He appeared for National Premier Soccer League side Carolina RailHawks U-23's in 2015.

Professional
Mecham signed with United Soccer League side Wilmington Hammerheads on December 15, 2015.

References

External links
 
 Seahawks bio

1994 births
Living people
American soccer players
Association football defenders
Carolina RailHawks NPSL players
National Premier Soccer League players
People from Blacksburg, Virginia
Soccer players from Virginia
Tormenta FC players
UNC Wilmington Seahawks men's soccer players
USL Championship players
USL League One players
Wilmington Hammerheads FC players